This is a list of fossils found at Maotianshan Shales, whose most famous assemblage of organisms are referred to as the Chengjiang biota.

Phylum Arthropoda
80 species, not counting Dinocarida, Nektaspida and Trilobita

 Acanthomeridion serratum
 Alalcomenaeus
 Almenia spinosa
 Apiocephalus elegans
 Branchiocaris yunnanensis
 Canadaspis laevigata
 Chengjiangocaris longiformis
 Chuandianella ovata
 Cindarella eucalla
 Clypecaris pteroidea
 Combinivalvula chengjiangensis
 Comptaluta inflata
 Comptaluta leshanensis
 Cyathocepalus bispinosus
 Dianchia mirabilis
 Diplopyge
 D. forcipatus
 D. minutus
 Dongshanocaris foliiformis
 Ercaia minuscula
 Ercaicunia multinodosa
 Forfexicaris valida
 Fortiforceps foliosa
 Fuxianhuia protensa
 Glossocaris occulatus
 Haikoucaris ercaiensis
 Isoxys
 I. auritus
 I. curvirostratus
 I. paradoxus
 Jianfengia multisegmentalis
 Jianshania furcatus
 Jiucunella paulula
 Kuamaia
 K. lata
 K. muricata
 Kuanyangia pustulosa
 Kunmingella
 K. angustacostata
 K. douvillei
 K. guanshanensis
 Kunmingocaris bispinosus
 Kunyangella cheni
 Leanchoilia
 L. asiatica
 L. illecebrosa
 Liangshanella liangshenensis
 Mafangia subscalaria
 Mafangocaris multinodus
 Malongella bituerculata
 Occacaris oviformis
 Ovalicephalis mirabilis
 Panlongia
 P. spinosa
 P. tetranudosa
 Parakunmingella malongensis
 Parapaleomerus sinensis
 Pectocaris spatiosa
 Pisinnocaris subconigera
 Primicaris larvaformis
 Pseudoiulia cambriensis
 Pterotum triacanthus
 Pygmaclypeatus daiensis
 Retifacies abnormalis
 Rhombicalvaria acanthi
 Saperion glumaceum
 Sidneyia sinica
 Sinoburius lunaris
 Skioldia aldna
 Spinokunmingella typica
 Sunella grandis
 Squamacula clypeata
 Synophalos xynos
 Syrrhaptis intes
 Tanglangia caudata
 Tauricornicaris
 T. latizonae
 T. oxygonae
 Trigoides aclis
 Tsunyiella daindongensis
 Tuzoia sinensis
 Urokodia aequalis
 Wutingella binodosa
 Xandarella spectaculum
 Yiliangocaris ellipticus
 Yunnanocaris megista

Class Dinocaridida 

 Amplectobelua symbrachiata
 Cucumericrus decoratus
 Houcaris saron
 Innovatiocaris maotianshanensis
 Innovatiocaris? multispiniformis
 Laminacaris chimera
 Lenisicaris lupata
 Lyrarapax unguispinus
 Lyrarapax trilobus
 Omnidens amplus
 Ramskoeldia consimilis
 Ramskoeldia platyacantha

Class Nektaspida 

2 species
 Misszhouia longicaudata 
 Naraoia spinosa

Class Trilobita 
6 species
 Eoredlichia intermedia
 Kuanyangia pustulosa
 Palaeolenus lantenoisi
 Tsunyidiscus aclis
 Wutingaspis tingi
 Yunnanocephalus yunnanensis

Phylum Brachiopoda 
5 species
 Diandongia pista
 Heliomedusa orienta
 Lingulella chengjiangensis
 Lingulellotreta malongensis
 Longtancunella chengjiangensis

Clade Gnathifera 
2 species
 Amiskwia sinica
 Eognathacantha ercainella

Phylum Cnidaria 
 
3 species
 Archisaccophyllia kunmingensis
 Nailiana
 Priscapennamarina
 Xianguangia sinica

Phylum Chordata 

9 species
 Cathaymyrus
 C. diadexus
 C. haikouensis 
 Haikouella 
 H. jianshanensis 
 H. lanceolata 
 Haikouichthys ercaicunensis
 Myllokunmingia fengjiaoa
 Shankouclava anningense (a tunicate)
 Zhongjianichthys rostratus
 Zhongxiniscus intermedius

Phylum Ctenophora 
3 species
 Maotianoascus octonarius
 Sinoascus paillatus
 Stromatoveris psygmoglena

Phylum Entoprocta 
1 species
 Cotyledion tylodes

Phylum Echinodermata 
2 species
 Dianchicystis jianshanensis
 Vetulocystis catenata

Phylum Hemichordata 
2 species
 Galeaplumosus abilus
 Yunnanozoon lividum

Phylum Hyolitha 
8 species
 Ambrolinevitus
 A. maximus
 A. platypluteus
 A. ventricosus
 Burithes yunnanensis
 Glossolithes magnus
 Linevitus
 L. billingsi
 L. flabellaris
 L. opimus

Phylum Lobopodia 

10 species, not counting Omnidens
 Cardiodictyon catenulum
 Diania cactiformis
 Facivermis yunnanicus
 Hallucigenia fortis
 Jianshanopodia decorata
 Lenisambulatrix humboldti
 Luolishania longicruris
 Microdictyon sinicum
 Onychodictyon ferox
 Paucipodia inermis

Phylum Mollusca 

 Orthrozanclus elongata
 Petalilium latus
 Wiwaxia papilio

Phylum Nematomorpha 
3 species
 Cricocosmia jinningensis
 Maotianshania cylindrica
 Palaeoscolex sinensis

Phylum Phoronida 
1 species
 Iotuba chengjiangensis

Phylum Porifera 

15 species
 Allantospongia mica
Choia xiaolantianensis
Choiaella radiata
 Hazelia
 Leptomitella 
 Leptomitella confusa 
 Leptomitella conica 
 Leptomitella metta 
 Leptomitus teretiusculus 
 Paraleptomitella
 Paraleptomitella dictyodroma 
 Paraleptomitella globula 
 Quadrolaminiella 
 Quadrolaminiella crassa 
 Quadrolaminiella diagonalis 
 Saetaspongia densa
 Sinfoflabrum antiquum
 Triticispongia diagonata

Phylum Priapulida 
16 species
 Acosmia maotiania
 Archotuba conoidalis
 Corynetis brevis
 Gantoucunia aspera
 Lagenula triolata
 Oligonodus specialis
 Paraselkirkia jinningensis
 Palaeopriapulites parvus
 Protopriapulites haikouensis
 Sandaokania latinodosa
 Selkirkia
 Selkirkia elongata 
 Selkirkia sinica
 Sicyophorus rarus
 Xiaoheiqingella peculiaris
 Xishania longgiusula
 Yunnanopriapulus halteroformis

Phylum Vetulicolia 

10 species
Heteromorphus longicaudatus
Vetulicola
Vetulicola cuneata 
Vetulicola gantoucunensis
Vetulicola longbaoshanensis
Vetulicola rectangulata
Vetulicola monile
Beidazoon venustum
Didazoon hoae
Pomatrum ventralis
Yuyuanozoon magnificissimi

Enigmatic 
24 species

 Allonnia phrixothrix
 Anthrotum robustus
 Batofasciculus ramificans
 Cambrotentacus sanwuia
 Cheungkongella ancestralis
 Conicula straita
 Dinomischus venustus
 Discoides abnormalis
 Hippotrum spinatus
 Jiucunia petalina
 Maanshania crusticeps
 Macrocephalus elongates
 Parvulonoda dubia
 Phacatrum tubifer
 Phasangula striata
 Phlogites brevis
 Phlogites longus
 Priscapennamarina angusta
 Pristitoites bifarius
 Rhipitrus calvifer
 Rotadiscus grandis
 Stellostomites eumorphus (= Eldonia eumorpha)

Kingdom Protista (algae) 
 Fuxianospira gyrata
 Megaspirellus houi
 Sinocylindra yunnanensis
 Yuknessia

References 

Maotianshan
Maotianshan shales fossils